Alloasteropetes is a genus of moths of the family Noctuidae. The genus was erected by Yasunori Kishida and Yoshiyuki Machijima in 1994.

Species
Alloasteropetes olivacea Kishida & Machijima, 1994
Alloasteropetes guangdongensis Owada, Kishida & Wang, 2006 Guangdong
Alloasteropetes olivacea Kishida & Machijima, 1994 Taiwan
Alloasteropetes paradisea Kishida & Owada, 2003 Taiwan, China (Guangdong)
Alloasteropetes parallela (Sugi, 1996) India (Uttar Pradesh), Thailand, Vietnam

References

Kishida, Yasunori & Machijima, Yoshiyuki (1994). "Descriptions of a new genus and a species of Agaristinae (Lepidoptera: Noctuidae) from Taiwan".  Tyô to Ga. 45 (1) : 14-16. 

Agaristinae
Noctuoidea genera